The Scottish Seabird Centre is a marine conservation and education charity, that is supported by a 5 star visitor attraction in North Berwick, East Lothian, Scotland. Opened by HRH Duke of Rothesay in 2000 and funded by the Millennium Commission. The showpiece of the centre is the interactive live cameras out to the wildlife on the Firth of Forth islands, including Bass Rock, Isle of May, Fidra and Craigleith. The Bass Rock is the world's largest colony of Northern gannets with an estimated 150,000 birds present.

History 

Materials used to construct the centre were, whenever possible, environmentally sustainable and locally sourced. The centre was designed by Edinburgh architects Simpson & Brown to make use of natural light and ventilation, and to offer panoramic views both to sea and inland towards North Berwick Law. Very little plastic was used in construction, with wood, stone and metal being preferred.

The site now occupied by the Scottish Seabird Centre once overlooked the North Berwick Outdoor Swimming Pool, a feature of the North Berwick Harbour area from the nineteenth century until its eventual closure in 1996. The old pool has been filled in and is now a boat and dinghy park for members of the East Lothian Yacht Club, is the location of the Firth of Forth Lobster Hatchery, the Beach Wheelchair enterprise and has several colourful beach huts that sell local products. The buildings housing the learning hub, boat office and administration office of the Scottish Seabird Centre were previously a sun lounge room.

The Scottish Seabird Centre was one of the flagship projects backed by the Millennium Commission which distributed cash from the UK National Lottery to cultural and heritage-related projects. A 64p stamp commemorating the opening of the Seabird Centre was released in 2000 as part of the "Above & Beyond" collection in the Millennium Series. Although the stamp features a colony of gannets, the featured picture was taken in South Africa, not (as many assume) on the Bass Rock.

In August 2021, the charity appointed Louise Macdonald, national director for the Institute of Directors and CEO of Young Scot as its first ambassador.

Facilities 
The main attraction at the Scottish Seabird Centre is the recently refurbished (2019) Discovery Experience that contains interactive wildlife cameras which allow visitors to observe northern gannets, Atlantic puffins, shags, cormorants and other seabirds on the islands in the Firth of Forth. Additional wildlife includes seals and occasional sightings of dolphins and whales. The Discovery Experience also has a number of informative storyboards, mechanical and digital exhibits which bring Scotland's seabirds and underwater world to visitors. The exhibits cover: 
•	Seabirds (covering migration, seabird colonies, breeding and feeding)
•	Threats (covering fishing, invasive species, climate change and pollution)
•	Marine (kelp forests, coral reef, seals, cetaceans, intertidal zone)
•	Discover (recent sightings, interactive live cameras, seasonal wildlife)
There's a kids zone, gift shop and licensed cafe with an outdoor sun deck overlooking the Firth of Forth to the Bass Rock, and on a clear day to the Isle of May.

Throughout the year the charity offers educational workshops and has live science shows for families during school holidays, and there is a year-round programme of events and festivals. The Centre also organises a programme of walks, including a free guided early bird beach walk every month.

The Scottish Seabird Centre's wildlife adventure boat trips are operated in partnership with local operator Seafari Adventures (Forth) from North Berwick Harbour, to the islands from Easter to October. The Centre also has exclusive landing rights for the Bass Rock, owned by Sir Hew Hamilton-Dalrymple, and home to the world's largest colony of Northern gannets. Landing Trips to the Bass Rock are a very special, sense busting, wildlife experience as the numbers of northern gannets have soared to 150,000 over the years. Landing trips to the Isle of May are available departing from North Berwick, as well as hour-long trips around the Bass Rock on board the 55-seat catamaran and 12-seat RIBs.

Awards
The Scottish Seabird Centre, a VisitScotland five star visitor experience, has become extremely popular, winning many awards for environmental and sustainable tourism including the Green Tourism Gold Award and the Queen's Award for Enterprise in Sustainable Development in 2004, 2009 and 2013. Queen Elizabeth II and Prince Philip visited the town in July 2009 to present the Scottish Seabird Centre with the award.

The Bass Rock was also named BBC Countryfile Magazine's Nature Reserve of the Year 2014/15.

See also
Joseph Bryan Nelson

References

External links 

Scottish Seabird Centre Official site
Scottish Seabird Centre Strategic Plan for 2020 - 2025
Green Tourism - Review of the construction process
Architect's comments on the design of the centre

Buildings and structures in East Lothian
Nature centres in Scotland
Wildlife rehabilitation and conservation centers
Tourist attractions in East Lothian
Protected areas of East Lothian
Ornithological organizations
North Berwick